Trinity Bible College and Graduate School (TBCGS) is a private bible college and graduate school in Ellendale, North Dakota. It is affiliated with the Assemblies of God USA.

History
The school was first founded in Devils Lake in 1948, but after several moves, settled in Ellendale in 1972 where it assumed ownership of the former campus of the North Dakota State Normal and Industrial School for a mere $1 and an agreement to upgrade the campus and facilities.   The school primarily offers instruction in Biblical studies, with programs in business, intercultural studies, ministry, teacher education, and music.

In 2014, Trinity introduced its first graduate degree program, a Master of Arts in Missional Leadership.  Its graduate school has since expanded to offer two other MAs: Rural Ministries and Global Theology.  In March 2019, Trinity was approved to offer a research PhD in Practical Theology.

Trinity Bible College and Graduate School is accredited by Association for Biblical Higher Education.

Athletics
Trinity Bible College teams participate as a member of the National Christian College Athletic Association (NCCAA). Men's sports include basketball and cross country; while women's sports include basketball, cross country and volleyball. The Trinity Bible College Lions football team was previously an associate member of the NCAA Division III Upper Midwest Athletic Conference from 1997 to 2007. The football program was discontinued in 2019.

References

External links
Official website

Seminaries and theological colleges in North Dakota
Buildings and structures in Dickey County, North Dakota
Assemblies of God seminaries and theological colleges
Educational institutions established in 1948
Education in Dickey County, North Dakota
1948 establishments in North Dakota
Association of Christian College Athletics member schools